Kigali Car-Free Zone is a popular center in Kigali that relies primarily on walking or cycling for transport. In 2021, the Rwandan government considered an expansion and rebranding of this zone to improve congestion and infrastructure, and for environmental and quality of life benefits.  It is located on Road KN4 Avenue, between Kigali city headquarter's building , commercial buildings like Makuza Peace Plaza, Bank of Kigali , Ecobank Rwanda and Cogebanque

Process Planning 
Kigali Car-Free Zone project has been announced on 26 August 2015 by Kigali city, from 2015 car movement has been stopped in that zone , in March 2021 Kigali city announced modern construction and rebranding of Kigali Car-free zone and to Rename it "Imbuga City Walk", cost of the project estimated to be 6 Rwf billions

Facilities 
Imbuga City Walk components are: Pedestrian zones and Cycling friendly pavements; green corridor landscaping; kiosks and other items; exhibition zone; and kids’ playground, street benches and free Wi-Fi network ;city lounge and arcade; Pedestrian-friendly street lamps and Public toilets. In 2021, the Kigali city council launched renovation and giving it a new look to make it more beautiful and attractive.

References 

Kigali
Car-free zones in Africa
Tourism by city
Africa-related lists